Drums and Gods  is a 2001 German/Brazilian film directed by Georg Brintrup.

Plot
A Brazilian street boy, Antônio, wakes up early in the morning on the beach of Salvador (Bahia). At sunrise, he is overtaken by strange thoughts: The bible says that God created light even before the sun and the stars. Light, but not sunlight! Maybe the light is the light within our interior enlightenment. Nature's biggest catastrophe is when man began to think. However, before God created light, he said: “Let there be light!” So, before light there was the voice of God. 
A sound ... a big bang ... the sound of thunder ... rolling off a drum. Only this thunder had the power to create light. If it weren't for that sound from the depths, that primal noise, today man wouldn't be able to think. 

Antônio meets Valdyr, a blind black man who sees with his ears. The two become friends. Valdyr knows that man has lost his naturalness by thinking. Man gave a name to everything ... with words ... man gave sense to everything around him. For man, the whole world was changed and consequently his problems began. As this spirit invaded man, his inner peace was gone and violence appeared. This is why all men are striving to find that peace again and to recapture that primal wholeness. But how? They try to communicate with the Gods using a sound, similar to the primordial sound. In Brazil they use an instrument: the drum!

Antônio and Valdyr roam through the city of Salvador (Bahia) searching for this primordial sound. (Salvador is also known as “Black Rome” because of its cultural Afro-religious traditions). Along the way, they meet various drummers and learn that the drum is the oldest instrument that man used to communicate with the Gods. The drum calls the Gods. These descend and connect with humans. God and man become one again, one sound. At this point, understanding and reason no longer play a role. He, who understands the world only with his head, lives his life only half way. A man who thinks that he can rule the world with just his head creates danger for himself.

In the noisy carnival hustle and bustle, where nothing follows reason but rather emotion, Antônio senses a strange tension between his head and his stomach, which keeps him from staying calm.  Valdyr shows him that this tension is important. There is the same tension between the stretched skin of a drum and the sound that it makes. If the skin is not tightly stretched, the drum cannot make any sound. Antônio realizes that inside we have to be stretched like a drum skin in order to make sound, to become sound ourselves. “We too are instruments. And we have to always be playing.”

Cast
Vinícius Nascimento: Antônio
Cristóvão da Silva: Valdyr
Virginia Rodrigues: Sadness
Caetano Veloso: Himself
Edlo Mendes: Conqueror
Ipojucan Dias: Native Brazilian
Miller Fragoso: Sailor
Paolo Ferreira: Sailor
Fernando Lopes: Dancer
Antônia Ribeiro da Silva: Goddess Oxum
Vera Passos: Dancer
Leonardo Luz: Dancer

Production 
„When man began to think, at that moment began the most magnificent, the most monstrous of all natural disasters.“ This sentence and other theses from the book "South American meditations" by Baltic German philosopher Hermann von Keyserling form one of the basis of the filmic essay. Brintrup  was also influenced by Stefan Zweig's book “Brazil, Land of the Future”  in this film essay.

The Italian composer Aldo Brizzi took over the musical direction of the film. The songs of his album "Brizzi do Brazil", written for Brazilian and Portuguese singers, were recorded during the filming of the movie.  Brintrup integrated parts of these songs into the film, including "Mistero di Afrodite", by Caetano Veloso.

Soundtrack 
Major drumming groups from Salvador Bahia perform in the film: Kissukila, Terra em Transe, Swingue do Pelò, Banda Percussão do Bairro da Paz. The film's Soundtrack is also made up of excerpts from the following musical compositions:

Release and reception
The World Premiere of the film Drums and Gods (Tambores e Deuses) was on 22 September 2001 in the “Teatro di ICBA”, Salvador da Bahia. The film was the first co-production between German WDR and Brazilian TVB, where it was broadcast on 29 September 2001. The German television station WDR’s broadcast of this film was on 13 January 2002.

References

External links
 
 Presentation of the film

2001 films
German musical films
Brazilian musical films
Films shot in Brazil
2000s German films